Robert "Robbie" Costigan (born 1982) is an Irish Gaelic footballer who played as a left wing-back for the Tipperary senior team.

Born in Cahir, County Tipperary, Costigan first arrived on the inter-county scene at the age of twenty when he first linked up with the Tipperary under-21 team. He joined the senior panel during the 2002 championship. Costigan became a regular member of the starting fifteen of both teams and won one Tommy Murphy Cup medal.

As a member of the Munster inter-provincial team on a number of occasions Costigan won one Railway Cup medal. At club level he is a one-time championship medallist with Cahir.

Costigan retired from inter-county football following the conclusion of the 2013 championship.

Honours

Player

Cahir
Tipperary Senior Football Championship (1): 2003

Tipperary
Tommy Murphy Cup (1): 2005

Munster
Railway Cup (1): 2008

References

1982 births
Living people
Cahir Gaelic footballers
Tipperary inter-county Gaelic footballers
Munster inter-provincial Gaelic footballers